John James Corcoran  (1873–1901) was a Major League Baseball player. Niles played for Pittsburgh Pirates in the 1895 season. He played just six games in his career.

External links
Baseball-Reference.com page

Pittsburgh Pirates players
1873 births
1901 deaths
Baseball players from Cincinnati
19th-century baseball players
Norfolk Clam Eaters players
Norfolk Clams players
Norfolk Crows players
Detroit Tigers (Western League) players